Saxilby is a large village in the West Lindsey district of Lincolnshire, England, about  north-west from Lincoln, on the A57 road at the junction of the B1241. It is part of the civil parish of Saxilby and Ingleby, which includes the village of Ingleby. The population of the civil parish in 2001 was 3,679, increasing to 3,992 at the 2011 census.

Geography

The village lies on the north bank of the Roman Fossdyke Navigation. There are remains of a Roman camp just outside the village.

History

Etymology 
The name is of Viking origin, Old Norse Saksúlfr + byr, or "farmstead of a man called Saksulfr" and it appears as "Saxebi" in the Domesday Book (1086). In archived documents the village is often referred to as "Saxelby", with the current spelling of Saxilby only being found in common use from the late 19th century onwards.

Early history 
The Romans built the Fossdyke which runs through the Saxilby area, but it is unknown whether they settled on the site. Roman pottery has been found in digs in the area, which is what suggests they may have settled in this area. During the 9th century, Viking invaders took many areas of Lincolnshire and some settled in Saxilby. In the 12th century, the Normans began creating Manors and the Manor in the Saxilby area was given to Odo, the Bishop of Bayeux.

Local government and public services 
Saxilby with Ingleby Parish Council is made up of 14 Councillors. The Saxilby Ward of West Lindsey District Council has 2 seats. Saxilby falls under the Gainsborough parliamentary constituency, and the current MP for this area is Sir Edward Leigh, and has been since 1997, and was MP from 1983 for Gainsborough and Horncastle, the former Constituency for the Saxilby area.

Policing in Saxilby falls under the responsibility of the Lincolnshire Police, fire-fighting under the responsibility of the Lincolnshire Fire and Rescue Service, and the village is served by the East Midlands Ambulance Service (EMAS). The closest hospital is Lincoln County Hospital, which runs a 24-hour accident and emergency department. Saxilby has two medical practices: Trent Valley Surgery and Glebe Practice, both located on Sykes Lane. The Vicarage Veterinary Centre is located on Church Road.

Transport

Saxilby is situated next to the A57, which runs from Liverpool to Lincoln The B1241 road runs through the village, called Mill Lane from the A57 junction until it meets Church Road where it becomes Sturton Road.

Saxilby is served by a number of bus routes:
 100 – Lincoln to Scunthorpe via Gainsborough
 105, 107 – Lincoln to Gainsborough
 106 – Lincoln to Gainsborough via Saxilby
 777 – Lincoln to Saxilby

Saxilby railway station, on the Doncaster to Lincoln Line, is situated close to the centre of the village, having originally been built by the Great Northern and Great Eastern Joint Railway.

Education
Saxilby has its own primary school, Saxilby Church of England Primary School which received an overall judgement of Good on their 2012 Ofsted inspection, with one Outstanding feature. A number of secondary schools are located nearby, such as the Queen Elizabeth's High School in Gainsborough, Lincoln Castle Academy on Riseholme Road,  Lincoln Christ's Hospital School on Wragby Road in Lincoln, all of which receive children from the village.

Religion

Saxilby has been served by various different Christian churches including Church of England, Methodist, Wesleyan and, at one point, a St Andrew's Mission House. Today, Saxilby has a 12th-century church dedicated to Saint Botolph.  The Methodist church closed in 2020.

Sport 
The majority of sport in the village can be found at the Memorial Field. The Memorial Field is home to Saxilby Tennis Club, Saxilby Cricket Club, Saxilby Bowls Club and Saxilby Athletic F.C.

Saxilby Tennis Club was founded in 1925 and has been a part of the community ever since. The club play in multiple leagues including; The Lincoln District League, The Gainsborough League and North Kelsey Winter league.

Saxilby Athletic F.C. is a Men's football club that compete in the Lincoln Sunday Football League. Saxilby Athletic J.F.C. is a junior football club with male and female teams in a variety of age groups.

Amenities

Saxilby has a Co-op (including a pharmacy and Post Office) and various smaller shops including a gift and card shop, a fabric shop, two barbers/hairdressers, greengrocer and florist, a news agents/minimarket and a butchers shop.  The two village pubs are the Anglers Hotel on the High Street and the Sun Inn on Bridge Street. Food outlets include a tea room, a café, a Pizza Restaurant, a Chinese takeaway and a fish and chip shop.

The St Andrew's Community Centre is located on the recreation field and is home to two function rooms, the Pavilion Bar & Kitchen, the Parish Office, and Saxilby Library. The Village Hall, a former United Free Methodist Church, is used by Saxilby Drama Circle and Saxilby Women's Institute, and is a venue for other events. Saxilby is also home to an active Scout and Guide community, with all main sections of each movement present. The majority of these groups meet in the Jean Reville Memorial Scout and Guide HQ on Bridge Street.

Twinning
Saxilby is twinned with Haarlemmerliede en Spaarnwoude in the Netherlands.

References

External links

 Parish council

Villages in Lincolnshire
Civil parishes in Lincolnshire
West Lindsey District